This is a list of heads of state and heads of government who have visited North Macedonia.

References

Diplomatic visits by destination
Visits
Diplomatic visits